Montgolfier Glacier is a glacier situated between Rozier Glacier and Woodbury Glacier and flowing between Balis Ridge and Bacho Kiro Peak into Piccard Cove on the west coast of Graham Land, Antarctica.

The glacier was mapped by the Falkland Islands Dependencies Survey from photos taken by Hunting Aerosurveys Ltd in 1956–57, and was named by the UK Antarctic Place-Names Committee in 1960 for brothers Joseph-Michel and Jacques-Étienne Montgolfier, French papermakers, inventors of the hot air balloon in 1782–83, and pioneer balloonists.

References

Glaciers of Danco Coast